Not Enough Rope were a five piece folk-rock band that came from Perth, starting in 1994 before their break-up in 2001.

Biography

Not Enough Rope began in 1994 over a few beers at the Kalamunda Hotel in Perth, Western Australia. The initial idea was to get together, play a few songs and tell a few yarns. The group soon grew from three to five and it was regular rehearsals in the original bass player's (Adrian Conti) orchard packing shed. Soon the band were performing regular gigs, supporting Things of Stone and Wood in 1995 and even finding Jewel joining them on stage for an impromptu gig, after she had performed a major live show elsewhere that evening.

The name Not Enough Rope arose by accident, while rehearsing at Keally's garage, the band was brainstorming a name and eventually agreed on Not Enough Rope. It eventuated from a makeshift rope clothesline that had fallen down due to the end fraying and breaking, the band deciding that the name reflected their sound and style.

Even likened to The Pogues in their early days, there was something in their music that, if not touching the heart, it imbued a wistful and melancholy feeling with a touch of sweetness.

Their debut EP was I'll Tell You When I See You in 1996, followed by their debut album Fingerpistol and My Way EP (both in 1998) and Paying Off My Radials album in 2001, which features a cover of The Triffids' "Wide Open Road".

Matt Kealley now plays in acoustic folk rock band, Jigger, Matt Galligan is a professional photographer, Todd Lynch and Michael D. Lane went on to form King Brown and  Shanks Pony, a group Lynch is still actively involved in.  Michael performs regularly, generally in Fremantle, as a solo artist and a guest player for local original artists, and as a facilitator of inclusive music sessions with the community organisation Catch Music.

Byron Mavrick now works full-time as a Chartered Accountant in Perth, and is also a keen open-water swimmer. In 2012 he led a four-man team ("the Men in Grey Suits") in the Rottnest Channel Swim in a time of 6 hours and 6 minutes.

Members
 Matt Galligan - vocals, acoustic guitar, mandolin
 Matt Kealley - drums, percussion, harmonica, vocals
 Todd Lynch - accordion, piano organ, didgeridoo
 Byron Mavrick - lead guitar (original member)
 Adrian Conti - bass, acoustic guitar, mandolin (original member)
 Mike Lane - bass, acoustic guitar, mandolin
 Steve Bow - sound guy

Discography

Albums
 Fingerpistol (1998)
 Paying Off My Radials (2001)

EPs
 I'll Tell You When I See You (May 1996)AUS #97

Singles
 "My Way" (24 May 1998)

Notes

References
 Chris Thomas, Rope come clean on washing. Sunday Times, Rock On (Perth, WA), 17 September 1995
 Chris Thomas, CD tribute to dead dad. Sunday Times, Rock On (Perth, WA), 5 May 1996
 Spencer, Chris; Nowara, Zbig & McHenry, Paul. Who's Who of Australian Rock, p. 260, Fourth Edition (Five Mile Press, Melbourne, Australia), 1996
 Chris Thomas, Albums: I'll Tell You When I See You. Sunday Times, Rock On (Perth, WA), 2 June 1996
 Jacobson, Mara. They'll Tell You When They See You. Perth News (Perth, WA), 4 June 1996
 Chris Thomas Not Enough Rope Do It Their Way. Sunday Times (Perth, WA), April 1998
 Toovey, Kate. Untitled. X-Press (Perth, WA), 9 July 1998
 Folk-rock-pop on stage. Margaret River Mail (WA), 15 July 1998
 Coufos, Polly. Not Enough Rope. X-Press (Perth, WA), 29 October 1998
 Not Enough Rope To Hang Out at Prince. Bunbury Times (WA), 1998
 Tying Up A Steady Following. Margaret River Mail (WA), 1998
 Not Enough Rope, John Butler, Friends of Brian. Bubblehead (Perth, WA), 31 October 1999
 Local Release. Hype (Perth, WA), 5 November 1999
 Hunter, Chelsea. Old And New. X-Press (Perth, WA), 5 November 1999
 Chris Thomas, Please Don't Fade Away. Roped In (Perth, WA), December 2000

External links
 Not Enough Rope website
 Australian Music Online - Artist Profile

Western Australian musical groups
Musical groups established in 1994
Musical groups disestablished in 2001